The history of Paraguay begins with the interaction between the early Spanish colonists and the indigenous people. The agricultural Guaraní lived in eastern Paraguay and neighboring countries and the nomadic Guaycuruan tribes lived in western Paraguay. The first Spanish explorers reached Paraguay in 1524. As Paraguay lacked mineral wealth and was isolated and land-locked, it was relatively unimportant to the Spanish. The small number of Spanish men resident in Paraguay intermarried with native women, resulting in a mestizo population. Most of the Guaraní (often called "Indians" or "Indios" in older documents)  adopted the Roman Catholic religion of the Spaniards, but continued to speak the Guaraní language which along with Spanish is spoken by most people in Paraguay. In the 17th and 18th century the Jesuits established missions among the Guaraní which were called reductions. The Jesuits succeeded in spreading Christianity and giving the Guaraní some degree of protection from slave raiders and the labor demands of the Spanish and mestizo population.

On 14/15 May 1811 Paraguay declared its independence from Spain. Since independence, the country's history is mostly of authoritarian governments, especially the utopian regime of José Gaspar Rodríguez (El Supremo) from 1814 to 1840 and the government of Francisco Solano López (1862-1870), who presided over the near-destruction of the country in warfare against the combined forces of Brazil, Argentina, and Uruguay from 1865 through 1870. The Paraguayan War caused massive population losses in Paraguay, and cessions of extensive territories to Argentina and Brazil. Post-war politics became the alternate one-party rule of either the Colorado or the Liberal parties. From 1870 to 1954, Paraguay was ruled by 44 different men, 24 of whom were forced from office in military coups. Amidst authoritarian rule and political turmoil, Paraguay went to war, and mostly prevailed, with Bolivia from 1932 to 1935 to contest sovereignty over the Gran Chaco region. The Chaco War was the bloodiest war of the 20th century in Latin America, resulting in approximately 30,000 Paraguayan and 65,000 Bolivian casualties.

In 1954, General Alfredo Stroessner came to power and with the help of the Colorado Party ruled until 1989. With his ouster in a coup d'etat, movement toward a multi-party and democratic government began with a constitution adopted in 1992. Paraguay in the 21st century has largely avoided the political strife and strong-man rule that characterizes much of its history.

Colonial era

Native peoples

The homeland of the Guarani people was eastward from the Paraguay River, in the Misiones Province of Argentina and southern Brazil and as far east as the Atlantic coast near Rio de Janeiro. Their pre-Columbian population is estimated at between 300,000 and one million. With the arrival of Europeans, the population rapidly decreased due to epidemics of European diseases. The Guaraní were united only by language and cultural similarities. No political structure existed above the village level. The Guaraní were a semi-sedentary agricultural people.

Although the Guaraní initially resisted Spanish incursions into their lands, two characteristics influenced their early cooperation with the Spanish and missionaries. First, the Guaraní were themselves warlike, but they were threatened by hostile tribes around them and by slave raiders. The Spanish, especially Christian missionaries, afforded a degree of security to the Guaraní. Secondly, the Guaraní had a custom of exchanging women among themselves and with outsiders to cement alliances. This facilitated a proliferation of sexual relations of Guaraní women with Spanish men who had an average of 10 concubines each. In Paraguay, the mestizo offspring of Spanish/Guaraní unions had the legal rights of Spaniards. Coupled with the lack of interest by Spain and Spanish entrepreneurs in Paraguay, which produced neither mineral wealth nor agricultural exports, Paraguay became a mestizo society by 1580. Unique to Latin American countries, an indigenous language, Guaraní, is an official language alongside Spanish. The early mixing of the races, however, should not obscure the fact that the Spanish and mestizos subjected the Guaraní population to the encomienda system of forced labor after 1556 and the more benign, although even more controlling, reductions of Christian missionaries beginning in the 1580s.

The Gran Chaco, a semi-arid flatland west of the Paraguay River, was the home of the Guaycurú peoples. The most important of the Guaycurúans in Paraguay were the Payaguá, a riverine people ranging for  up and down the Paraguay River, and the Mbayá who lived in northwest Paraguay. The Guaycuru tribes were nomadic and warlike. The Mbayá developed a horse culture in the 17th century while the Payaguá made travel up and down the Paraguay River dangerous. These tribes frequently raided the Spanish settlers and Guaraní farmers. They resisted the reductions and Christianity of the missionaries and were a threat to the Spanish and other native peoples for more than 300 years. The name of Paraguay is probably derived from the Payaguás.

Early explorers and conquistadors

Much of the earliest written history of Paraguay comes from records of the Spanish colonization, beginning in 1516 with the Juan Díaz de Solís' failed expedition to the Río de la Plata. On the home voyage, after Solís' death, one of the vessels was wrecked off Santa Catarina Island near the Brazilian coast. Among the survivors was Aleixo Garcia, a Portuguese adventurer who acquired a working knowledge of the Guaraní language. Garcia was intrigued by reports of "the White King" who supposedly lived far to the west and governed cities of wealth and splendor, a reference to the Inca Empire.

In 1524, after eight years as a castaway Garcia joined a Guaraní invasion of the Inca Empire. Garcia's group discovered Iguazú Falls, crossed the Río Paraná and arrived at the site of Asunción, the future capital of the country, thirteen years before it was founded. At Asunción, the Guaraní gathered an army of 2,000 men and with Garcia they  crossed Gran Chaco and penetrated the outer defenses of the Inca Empire on the eastern slopes of the Andes. After Garcia's murder by his Indian allies, news of the raid reached the Spanish explorers on the coast. The explorer Sebastian Cabot was attracted to the Río Paraguay two years later. Cabot was sailing to the Orient in 1526 when he heard of Garcia's exploits. He decided that the Río de la Plata might provide passage to the Pacific, and, eager to win the riches of the Incas, he became the first European to explore that estuary.

Leaving a small force on the northern shore of the broad estuary, Cabot proceeded up the Río Paraná for about 160 kilometers, where he founded a settlement he named Sancti Spiritu. He continued upstream for another 800 kilometers, past the junction with the Río Paraguay. When navigation became difficult, Cabot turned back, after having obtained some silver objects that the Indians said came from a land far to the west. Cabot retraced his route on the Río Paraná and entered the Río Paraguay. Sailing upriver, Cabot and his men traded freely with the Guaraní tribes until a strong force of Agaces (Payaguá) Indians attacked them. About forty kilometers below the site of Asunción, Cabot encountered a tribe of Guaraní in possession of silver objects, perhaps some of the spoils of Garcia's treasure. Imagining that he had found the route to the riches of Peru, Cabot renamed the river Río de la Plata.

Cabot returned to Spain in 1530 and told Emperor Charles V (1519–56) about his discoveries. Charles gave permission to Don Pedro de Mendoza to mount an expedition to the Plata basin. The emperor also named Mendoza governor of the Governorate of New Andalusia and granted him the right to name his successor. Mendoza, a sickly and disturbed man, proved to be utterly unsuitable as a leader, and his cruelty nearly undermined the expedition. Choosing what was possibly the worst site for the first Spanish settlement in South America, in February 1536 Mendoza built a fort at a place of poor anchorage on the southern side of the Plata estuary on an inhospitable, windswept, dead-level plain where not a tree or shrub grew. Dusty in the dry season, a bog in the rains, the place was inhabited by the fierce Querandí tribe, who resisted the Spaniards. Ignoring these conditions, the Spanish named the outpost Buenos Aires (Nuestra Señora del Buen Ayre).

Meanwhile, Juan de Ayolas, who was Mendoza's second-in-command and who had been sent upstream to reconnoiter, returned with corn and news that Cabot's fort at Sancti Spiritu had been abandoned. Mendoza dispatched Ayolas to explore a possible route to Peru. Accompanied by Domingo Martínez de Irala, Ayolas again sailed upstream until he reached a small bay on the Río Paraguay, which he named Candelaria, the present-day Fuerte Olimpo. Appointing Irala his lieutenant, Ayolas ventured into the Chaco and was never seen again.

After Mendoza unexpectedly returned to Spain, two other members of the expedition—Juan de Salazar de Espinosa and Gonzalo de Mendoza—explored the Río Paraguay and met up with Irala. Leaving him after a short time, Salazar and Gonzalo de Mendoza descended the river, stopping at a fine anchorage. They commenced building a fort on 15 August 1537, the date of the Feast of the Assumption, and called it Asunción (Nuestra Señora Santa María de la Asunción, in full, Our Lady Saint Mary of the Assumption).

Within 20 years, the new town had a population of about 1,500. Transcontinental shipments of silver passed through Asunción en route from Peru to Europe. Asunción became the center of a Spanish province that encompassed a large portion of central South America — it was dubbed La Provincia Gigante de Indias. Asunción also was the base for colonization of this part of South America. Spaniards moved northwestward across the Chaco to found Santa Cruz in present-day Bolivia; eastward to occupy the rest of present-day Paraguay; and southward along the river to re-found Buenos Aires, which its inhabitants had abandoned in 1541 to move to Asunción.

The young colony 

Uncertainties over the departure of Pedro de Mendoza led Charles V to promulgate a cédula (decree) that was unique in colonial Latin America. The cédula granted colonists the right to elect the governor of Río de la Plata Province either if Mendoza had failed to designate a successor or if a successor had died. Two years later, the colonists elected Irala as governor. His domain included all of present-day Paraguay, Argentina, Uruguay, most of Chile, as well as large parts of Brazil and Bolivia. In 1542 this province became part of the newly established Viceroyalty of Peru, with its seat in Lima. Beginning in 1559 the Real Audiencia of Charcas based in present-day Sucre controlled the province's legal affairs.

Irala's rule set the pattern for Paraguay's internal affairs until Independence. In addition to the Spaniards, Asunción's population included immigrants, mostly men, from present-day France, Italy, Germany, England, and Portugal. This community of about 350 chose wives and concubines from Guaraní women. Irala had 70 concubines (his surname fills several pages in the Asunción telephone directory). He encouraged his men to marry Indian women and give up thoughts of returning to Spain. Paraguay soon became a colony of mestizos. Continued arrivals of Europeans resulted in development of a criollo elite.

The peace that had prevailed under Irala ended in 1542 when Charles V appointed Alvar Núñez Cabeza de Vaca, one of the most renowned conquistadors of his age, as governor of the province. Cabeza de Vaca arrived in Asunción after having lived for eight years among the natives of Spanish Florida. Almost immediately the Rio de la Plata Province – now consisting of 800 Europeans – split into two warring factions. Cabeza de Vaca's enemies accused him of cronyism and opposed his efforts to protect the interests of native tribes. Cabeza de Vaca tried to placate his enemies by launching an expedition into the Chaco in search of a route to Peru. This antagonized Chaco tribes so much that they started a two-year war against the colony, which threatened its survival. In the colony's first of many revolts against the crown, the settlers seized Cabaza de Vaca, sent him back to Spain in fetters, and returned the governorship to Irala.

A Guaraní woman from the early-colonial era, known by the Christian name of Juliana, is regarded as one of the most prominent female figures in the history of Paraguay. She is famous for killing her Spaniard master or husband between 1539 and 1542 and inciting other indigenous women to do the same. Despite having confessed to the crime, and that she even boasted of her actions to her peers, Juliana was set free, although Cabeza de Vaca had her arrested and executed upon taking command of Asunción in 1542.

Irala ruled without further interruption until his death in 1556. His governorship was one of the most humane in the Spanish New World at that time, and marked the transition among the settlers from conquerors to landowners. Irala maintained good relations with the Guaraní, pacified hostile tribes, explored the Chaco, and began trade relations with Peru. He encouraged beginnings of a textile industry and the introduction of cattle, which flourished in the country's fertile hills and meadows. Father Pedro Fernández de la Torre arrived on 2 April 1556, as the first bishop of Asunción, marking the official establishment of the Roman Catholic Church in Paraguay. Irala presided over the construction of the cathedral, two churches, three convents, and two schools.

Irala eventually antagonized the native peoples. In the last years of his life he yielded to pressure from settlers and established the encomienda system, under which Spanish settlers received estates of land along with the right to the labor and produce of natives who were living on this land. Although encomenderos were expected to care for the spiritual and material needs of natives, the system quickly degenerated into virtual slavery. 20,000 natives were divided among 320 encomenderos, which sparked a full-scale tribal revolt in 1560 and 1561.

Political instability began troubling the colony and revolts became commonplace. Given his limited resources and manpower, Irala could do little to check the raids of Portuguese marauders along his eastern borders. Irala left Paraguay prosperous for the Europeans and relatively at peace.

Jesuit missions among the Guaraní

The Guaraní people of eastern Paraguay and neighboring Brazil and Argentina were in crisis in the early 17th century.  Recurrent epidemics of European diseases had reduced their population by up 50 percent and the forced labor of the encomiendas by the Spanish and mestizo colonists had made virtual slaves of many. Franciscan missionaries began establishing missions called reductions in the 1580s. The first Jesuits arrived in Asunción in 1588 and founded their first mission (or reduction) of San Ignacio Guazú in 1609. The objectives of the Jesuits were to make Christians of the Guaraní, impose European values and customs (which were regarded as part and parcel of a Christian life), and isolate and protect the Guaraní from European colonists and slavers.

In addition to recurrent epidemics, the Guaraní were threatened by the slave-raiding Bandeirantes from Brazil, who captured natives and sold them as slaves to work in sugar plantations or as concubines and household servants. Having depleted native populations near São Paulo, they discovered the richly populated Jesuit missions. Initially, the missions had few defenses against the slavers and thousands of Guaraní were captured and enslaved. About 10,000 of 30,000 Guaraní in the missions chose to accompany the Jesuits. In 1641 and 1642, armed by the Jesuits, Guaraní armies defeated the Bandeirantes and ended the worst of the slave trade in their region. From this point on the Jesuit missions enjoyed growth and prosperity, punctuated by epidemics. At the peak of their importance in 1732, the Jesuits presided over 141,000 Guaraní (including a sprinkling of other peoples) who lived in about 30 missions.

The opinions of historians differ with regard to the Jesuit missions. The missions are much-romanticized with the Guaraní portrayed as innocent children of nature and the Jesuits as their wise and benevolent guides to an earthly utopia. "Proponents...highlight that the Jesuits protected the Indians from exploitation and preserved the Guaraní language and other aspects of indigenous culture."  "By means of religion," wrote the 18th century philosopher d'Alembert, "the Jesuits established a monarchical authority in Paraguay, founded solely on their powers of persuasion and on their lenient methods of government. Masters of the country, they rendered happy the people under their sway." Voltaire called the Jesuit missions "a triumph of humanity".

To the contrary the detractors say that 'the Jesuits took away the Indians' freedom, forced them to radically change their lifestyle, physically abused them, and subjected them to disease."  Moreover, the missions were inefficient and their economic success "depended on subsidies from the Jesuit order, special protection and privileges from the Crown, and the lack of competition"  The Jesuits are portrayed as "exploiters" who "sought to create a kingdom independent of the Spanish and Portuguese Crowns."

The Comunero Revolt (1721 to 1735) was a serious protest by Spanish and mestizo Paraguayans against the Jesuit missions. The residents of Paraguay violently protested the pro-Jesuit government of Paraguay, Jesuit control of Guaraní labor, and what they regarded as unfair competition for the market for products such as yerba mate. Although the revolt ultimately failed and the missions remained intact, the Jesuits were expelled from institutions they had created in Asunción. In 1756, the Guaraní protested the relocation of seven missions, fighting (and losing) a brief war with both the Spanish and Portuguese. The Jesuits were accused of inciting the Guaraní to rebel. In 1767, Charles III of Spain (1759–88) expelled the Jesuits from the Americas. The expulsion was part of an effort in the Bourbon Reforms to assert more Spanish control over its American colonies. In total, 78 Jesuits departed from the missions leaving behind 89,000 Guaraní in 30 missions. 

According to historian Sarreal, most Guaraní initially welcomed the expulsion of the Jesuits. Spanish authorities made promises to Guaraní leaders and gained their support. The Guaraní leaders of one mission thanked the authorities who "liberated us from the bondage that we lived in as slaves." Within two years, however, the financial situation of the missions was deteriorating and Guaraní began leaving the missions seeking both freedom and higher wages. A decree in 1800 freed the Guaraní still in the missions from their communal obligation to labor. By 1840, the former missions were in ruins. While some Guaraní were employed outside the missions, many families were impoverished. A growing number of mestizos occupied what had formerly been mission lands. in 1848, Paraguayan President Carlos Antonio López declared that all Indians were citizens of Paraguay and distributed the last of the missions' communal lands.  The ruins of Jesuit Missions of La Santísima Trinidad de Paraná and Jesús de Tavarangue have been designated World Heritage Sites by UNESCO.

Colonial decline

The Comuneros revolt was symptomatic of the province's decline. Since the re-founding of Buenos Aires in 1580, the steady deterioration in the importance of Asunción contributed to growing political instability within the province. In 1617, the Governorate of the Río de la Plata was divided into two smaller provinces: Governorate of Paraguay, with Asunción as its capital, and Río de la Plata, with headquarters in Buenos Aires. With this decision, Asunción lost control of the Río de la Plata estuary and became dependent on Buenos Aires for maritime shipping. In 1776, the crown created the Viceroyalty of Río de la Plata; Paraguay, which had been subordinate to Lima, now became a provincial outpost of Buenos Aires. Located at the periphery of the empire, Paraguay served as a buffer state. The Portuguese blocked Paraguayan territorial expansion in the north, native tribes blocked it – until their expulsion – in the south, and the Jesuits blocked it in the east.

The Viceroyalty of Peru and the Real Audiencia of Charcas had nominal authority over Paraguay, while Madrid largely neglected the colony. Madrid preferred to avoid the intricacies and the expense of governing and defending a remote colony that had shown early promise but ultimately proved to have little value. The governors of Paraguay had no royal troops at their disposal and were instead dependent on a militia composed of colonists. Paraguayans were forced into the colonial militia to serve extended tours of duty away from their homes, contributing to a severe labor shortage. Paraguayans claimed that the 1537 cédula gave them the right to choose and depose their governors. The colony, and in particular the Asunción municipal council (cabildo), earned a reputation for being in continual revolt against the Crown.

As a result of its distance from the rest of the empire, Paraguay had little control over important decisions that affected its economy. Spain appropriated much of Paraguay's wealth through burdensome taxes and regulations. Yerba maté, for instance, was practically priced out of the regional market. At the same time, Spain was using most of its wealth from the New World to import manufactured goods from the more industrialized countries of Europe, notably Britain. Spanish merchants borrowed from British merchants to finance their purchases; merchants in Buenos Aires borrowed from Spain; those in Asunción borrowed from the porteños (residents of Buenos Aires), and Paraguayan peones (landless peasants in debt to landlords) bought goods on credit. The result was dire poverty in Paraguay and an increasingly impoverished empire.

Independence of 1811

The French Revolution, the rise of Napoleon Bonaparte, and the subsequent wars in Europe weakened Spain's ability to maintain contact with and defend and control its colonies. British invasions of the River Plate of 1806–7 were repulsed by the local colonial troops and volunteer militias without help from Spain.

Among the many causes of the May Revolution were Napoleon's invasion of Spain in 1808, the capture of the Spanish king, Ferdinand VII, and Napoleon's attempt to put his brother Joseph Bonaparte on the Spanish throne, which severed the major remaining links between the metropolis and the colonies as Joseph had no supporters in Spanish America. Without a king, the entire colonial system lost its legitimacy, and colonies revolted. The Buenos Aires open cabildo deposed the Spanish viceroy on 25 May 1810, vowing to rule in the name of Ferdinand VII. The May Revolution led to the creation of the United Provinces of the Río de la Plata which wanted to bring Province of Paraguay under its control. This porteño action had unforeseen consequences for the histories of Argentina and Paraguay. News of the revolutionary events in Buenos Aires stunned royalist citizens of Asunción. Discontent with the Spanish monarchy was put aside because of the much bigger rivalry with the city of Buenos Aires.

The porteños bungled their effort to extend control over Paraguay by choosing José Espínola y Peña as their spokesman in Asunción. Espínola was "perhaps the most hated Paraguayan of his era", in the words of historian John Hoyt Williams. Espínola's reception in Asunción was less than cordial, partly because he was closely linked to the ex-governor Lázaro de Rivera, who had arbitrarily executed hundreds of citizens until he was forced from office in 1805. Barely escaping arrest in Paraguay, Espínola fled back to Buenos Aires and lied about the extent of porteño popularity in Paraguay, causing the Buenos Aires Primera Junta to make a disastrous decision to launch the Paraguay campaign and send 1,100 troops under General Manuel Belgrano to subdue Asunción. Led by royalists, Paraguayan troops reinforced by local militias soundly thrashed the porteños at Battle of Paraguarí and Battle of Tacuarí. Officers from both sides openly fraternized during the campaign and from these contacts Paraguayans learned that Spanish dominance in South America was ending, and that they now held the real power.

The actions of the last Spanish governor Bernardo de Velasco only further agitated local politicians and military officers. Believing that Paraguayan officers posed a threat to his rule, Governor Velasco dispersed and disarmed local forces and sent most of the soldiers home without paying them for their eight months of service. Velasco previously had lost face when, believing that Belgrano had won at Paraguarí, he fled the battlefield and caused a panic in Asunción. The last straw were Velasco's negotiations with Brazilian Portuguese during which he asked for military and financial help. This move ignited a military uprising in Asunción on 14 May 1811 and formation of a power-sharing junta. On 17 May a public proclamation informed people that a ruling junta, consisting of Governor Velasco, Gaspar Rodriguez de Francia and Army captain Juan Valeriano de Zeballos, had been created.

Historical flags of Paraguay

Era of dictatorships (1814–1870)

After the first revolutionary years, Congress in 1814 elected José Gaspar Rodríguez de Francia to be the supreme dictator (Supremo) of Paraguay. Under dictatorships of Francia (1814–1840), Carlos Antonio López (1841–1862) and Francisco Solano López (1862–1870) Paraguay developed quite differently from other South American countries. They encouraged self-sufficient economic development, state ownership of most industries and imposed a high level of isolation from neighboring countries. The regime of the López family was characterized by a harsh centralism in the production and distribution of goods. There was no distinction between the public and the private sphere, and the López family ruled the country as it would a large estate.

Francia, 1814–40

José Gaspar Rodríguez de Francia served from 1811 until his death in 1840 and built a strong, prosperous, secure nation at a time when Paraguay's continued existence as an independent country seemed unlikely.

Paraguay at independence was a relatively undeveloped country. Most residents of Asunción and virtually all rural inhabitants were illiterate. University education was limited to the few who could afford studies at the National University of Córdoba, in present-day Argentina. Very few people had any experience in government, finance, or diplomacy. The country was surrounded by hostile neighbors, from warlike Chaco tribes to the Argentine Confederation and Empire of Brazil. Strong measures were needed to save the country from disintegration.

Frugal, honest, competent, and diligent, Francia was popular with the lower classes of Creoles and native peoples. Despite popularity, Francia's dictatorship trampled on human rights, imposing a police state based on espionage, threats and force. Under Francia, Paraguay underwent a social upheaval that destroyed the old colonial elites.

After the military uprising of 14–15 May 1811, which brought independence, Francia became a member of the ruling junta. Although the real power initially rested with the military, Francia's many talents attracted support from the nation's farmers. Francia built his power base on his organizational abilities and his forceful personality. By outwitting porteño diplomats in the negotiations that produced the Treaty of 11 October 1811, in which Argentina implicitly recognized Paraguayan independence in return for vague promises of a military alliance, Francia proved that he possessed skills crucial to the future of the country.

Francia consolidated his power by convincing Paraguayans that he was indispensable. By the end of 1811, dissatisfied with the political role that military officers were playing, he resigned from the junta. From his modest chacra (cottage or hut) at Ibaray, near Asunción, he told the visiting citizens that their revolution had been betrayed, that the change in government had only traded a Spanish-born elite for a criollo one, and that the junta was incompetent.

In fact, Paraguay did face many problems. The Portuguese were threatening to overrun the northern frontiers, and after realizing that Paraguay would not fulfill the 11 October treaty and join their federation, United Provinces of the Río de la Plata started a trade war by closing Río de la Plata to Paraguayan commerce, levying taxes and seizing ships. The porteño government also asked for Paraguayan military assistance in its First Banda Oriental campaign.

When Paraguayan junta learned that a porteño diplomat was coming to Asunción, it realized that it was not competent to negotiate and in November 1812, junta members invited Francia to take charge of foreign policy. The junta agreed to place half of the army and half of the available munitions under Francia's command. Francia now controlled the government. When the Argentine envoy, Nicolás de Herrera arrived in May 1813, he was told that all important decisions had to wait for the meeting of a Paraguayan Congress in late September. Under virtual house arrest, Herrera had little scope to build support for unification, even though he resorted to bribery.

The Second National Congress was held from 30 September until 12 October 1813. It was attended by 1100 delegates, chosen by universal male suffrage and presided over by Pedro Juan Caballero. Congress rejected a proposal for Paraguayan participation at a constitutional congress at Buenos Aires and approved the new Constitution on 12 October 1813 when Paraguayan Republic was officially proclaimed (the first in South America). It also created a two-man executive body with two consuls – Fulgencio Yegros and Francia. Yegros, a man without political ambitions, represented the nationalist criollo military elite, while Francia was more powerful of the two because he derived his strength from the nationalist masses.

The Third National Congress was held on 3–4 October 1814 and replaced the two-man consulate with a single-man dictatorship, to which Franzia was elected.

El Supremo Dictador
Francia detested the political culture of the old regime and considered himself a revolutionary. He admired and emulated the most radical elements of the French Revolution. Although some commentators have compared him to the Jacobin Maximilien de Robespierre (1758–1794), Francia's policies and ideas perhaps were closest to those of François-Noël Babeuf (1760–1797), the French utopian who wanted to abolish private property and to communalize land as a prelude to founding a "republic of equals". The government of Caraí Guazú ("Great Señor", as the poor Guaranís called Francia) was a dictatorship that destroyed the power of the colonial élite and advanced the interests of common Paraguayans. In contrast to other states in the region, Paraguay was efficiently and honestly administered, stable, and secure (by 1827 army grew to 5000 men with 20 000 in reserve). The justice system treated criminals leniently. Murderers, for example, were put to work on public projects. Asylum to political refugees from other countries was granted, as in the notable case of Uruguayan patriot José Gervasio Artigas.

At the same time, a system of internal espionage destroyed free speech. People were arrested without charge and disappeared without trial. Torture in the so-called "Chamber of Truth" was applied to those suspected of plotting to overthrow Francia. He sent political prisoners, numbering approximately 400 in any given year, to a detention camp where they were shackled in dungeons and denied medical care and even the use of sanitary facilities.

In 1820, four years after the Congress had named Francia dictator for life with the title Supremo Dictator Perpetuo de la Republica del Paraguay (Supreme Dictator in Perpetuity), Francia's security system uncovered and quickly crushed a plot by the élite to assassinate El Supremo. Francia arrested almost 200 prominent Paraguayans among whom were all the leading figures of the 1811 independence movement, and executed most of them. In 1821 Francia struck against the Spanish-born elite, summoning all of Paraguay's 300 or so peninsulares to Asunción's main square, where he accused them of treason, had them arrested, and held them in jail for 18 months. They were released only after agreeing to pay an enormous collective indemnity of 150,000 pesos (about 75 percent of the annual state budget), an amount so large that it broke their predominance in the Paraguayan economy.

In order to destroy the colonial racial hierarchy which had also discriminated against him because of his mixed blood, Francia forbade Europeans from marrying other Europeans, thus forcing the élite to choose spouses from among the local population.

He sealed Paraguay's borders to the outside world and executed anyone who attempted to leave the country. Foreigners who managed to enter Paraguay had to remain there in virtual arrest for many years, such as botanist Aimé Bonpland, who could not leave Paraguay for ten years.

Both of these decisions actually helped to solidify the Paraguayan identity. There no longer were separate racial identities; all inhabitants had to live within the borders of Paraguay and build a new society which has created the modern Paraguayan society in which Hispanic and Guaraní roots were equally strong.

Paraguayan international trade stopped almost completely. The decline ruined exporters of yerba maté and tobacco. These measures fell most harshly on the members of the former ruling class of Spanish or Spanish-descended church officials, military officers, merchants, and hacendados (large landowners).

The state soon developed native industries in shipbuilding and textiles, a centrally planned and administered agricultural sector, which was more diversified and productive than the prior export monoculture, and other manufacturing capabilities. These developments supported Francia's policy of economic self-sufficiency.

Targeting the Church
One of Francia's special targets was the Roman Catholic Church, which had provided an essential support to Spanish rule by spreading the doctrine of the "divine right of kings" and inculcating the native masses with a resigned fatalism about their social status and economic prospects. In 1824 Francia banned all religious orders, closed the only seminary, "secularized" monks and priests by forcing them to swear loyalty to the state, abolished the fuero eclesiástico (the privilege of clerical immunity from civil courts), confiscated Church property, and subordinated its finances to state control.

The common people benefited from the suppression of the traditional elites and from the expansion of the state. Francia took land from the elite and the church and leased it to the poor. About 875 families received homesteads from the lands of the former seminary. The various fines and confiscations levied on the elites helped to reduce taxes for everyone else. As a result, Francia's attacks on the elite and his state-socialist policies provoked little popular resistance. The fines, expropriations, and confiscations of foreign-held property meant that the state quickly became the nation's largest landowner, eventually operating forty-five animal-breeding farms. Run by army personnel, these farms were so successful that surplus animals were given away to the peasants.

Legacy
An extremely frugal and honest man, Francia left the state treasury with at least twice as much money in it as when he took office, including 36,500 pesos of his unspent salary, the equivalent of several years' salary.

Francia's greatest accomplishment, the preservation of Paraguayan independence, resulted directly from a non-interventionist foreign policy. Regarding Argentina as a potential threat to Paraguay, he shifted his foreign policy toward Brazil by quickly recognizing Brazilian independence in 1822. This move, however, resulted in no special favors for the Brazilians from Francia, who was also on good, if limited, terms with Juan Manuel Rosas, the Argentine governor. Francia prevented civil war and secured his role as dictator when he cut off his internal enemies from their friends in Buenos Aires. Despite his "isolationist" policies, Francia conducted a profitable but closely supervised import-export trade with both countries to obtain key foreign goods, particularly armaments.

All of these political and economic developments put Paraguay on the path of independent nationhood, yet the country's undoubted progress during the years of the Franciata took place because of complete submission to Francia's will. El Supremo personally controlled every aspect of Paraguayan public life. No decision at the state level, no matter how small, could be made without his approval. All of Paraguay's accomplishments during this period, including its existence as a nation, were attributed almost entirely to Francia.

Carlos Antonio López, 1841–62

After Francia's death on 20 September 1840, a political confusion erupted, because El Supremo, now El Difunto (the Dead One), had left no successor. After a few days, a junta led by Manuel Antonio Ortiz emerged, freed some political prisoners, arrested Francia's secretary Polycarpo Patiño, and soon proved itself ineffectual at governing. On 22 January 1841, Ortiz was overthrown by Juan José Medina who in turn was overthrown on 9 February in a coup led by Mariano Roque Alonzo.

Alonzo lacked authority to rule, and on 14 March 1841, the two-man consulate of early Independence era was recreated. Besides Alonzo now ruled Carlos Antonio López as co-consul. This Second Consulate lasted until 13 March 1844, when Congress named Lopez the President of the Republic, a post he held until his death in 1862.

While maintaining a strong political and economic grip on the country, and despite all his shortcomings, Lopez worked towards strengthening Paraguay's independence.

López, a lawyer, was one of the most educated men in the country. Although López's government was similar to Francia's system, his appearance, style, and policies were different. Francia had pictured himself as the first citizen of a revolutionary state, whereas López used the all-powerful state to enrich himself and his family. In contrast to lean Francia, López was obese (a "great tidal wave of human flesh", according to one witness). López was a despot who wanted to found a dynasty and ran Paraguay like a personal fiefdom. López soon became the largest landowner and cattle rancher in the country, amassing a fortune, which he augmented with profits from the state's monopoly on the yerba maté trade.

Despite his greed, Paraguay prospered under El Excelentísimo (the Most Excellent One), as López was known. Under López, Paraguay's population increased from about 220,000 in 1840 to about 400,000 in 1860.

During his term of office, López improved national defense, abolished the remnants of the reducciones, stimulated economic development, and tried to strengthen relations with foreign countries. He also tried to reduce the threat from the marauding native tribes in the Chaco. Paraguay made large strides in education. When López took office, Asunción had only one primary school. During López's reign, more than 400 schools were built for 25,000 primary students, and the state re-instituted secondary education. López's educational development plans progressed with difficulty, because Francia had purged the country of the educated elite, which included teachers.

López loosened restrictions on foreign relations, boosted exports, invited foreign physicians, engineers, and investors to settle in Paraguay, and paid for students to study abroad. In 1853 he sent his son Francisco Solano to Europe to buy guns. López was worried about the possibility of a war with Brazil or Argentina, so he created an army of 18,000 soldiers with a reserve of 46,000, at that time the largest army in South America.

"As British and other foreign technicians poured into the country, they were set to work almost entirely on the creation of a military–industrial complex, and the greatest project of the era was a huge, sprawling fortress of Humaitá, the 'Sevastopol of the Americas'."

Several highways and a telegraph linking Asuncion with Humaitá were built. A British firm began building a railroad from Asunción to Paraguarí, one of South America's first, in 1858. On 22 September 1861, the Central railway station was opened in Asunción. Foreign experts helped build an iron factory at Ybycuí and a large armory.

Yet despite his apparent liberalism, Antonio López was a dictator who allowed Paraguayans no more freedom to oppose the government than they had had under Francia. Congress became his puppet, and the people abdicated their political rights, a situation enshrined in the 1844 Constitution, which placed all power in López's hands.

Slavery
Slavery had existed in Paraguay since early colonial days. Settlers had brought slaves to work as domestic servants, but were generally lenient about their bondage. Conditions worsened after 1700, however, with the importation of about 50,000 African slaves to be used as agricultural workers. Under Francia, the state acquired about 1,000 slaves when it confiscated property from the elite. López did not free these slaves; instead, he enacted the 1842 Law of the Free Womb, which ended the slave trade and guaranteed that the children of slaves would be free at age twenty-five. The new law served only to increase the slave population and depress slave prices as the slave birth rates soared.

Foreign relations
Despite being de facto independent since 1811 and having proclaimed a Republic in 1813, Paraguay formally declared independence only on 25 November 1842 and in 1844 adopted a new Constitution that replaced the Constitution of 1813. Based on this, Paraguay started to gain official international recognition.

Foreign relations began to increase in importance under López, who retained Paraguay's traditional mistrust of the surrounding states, yet lacked Francia's diplomatic skills. Initially, López feared an attack by the Buenos Aires dictator Rosas. With Brazilian encouragement, López dropped Francia's policy of neutrality and began meddling in Argentine politics. Using the slogan "Independence or Death", López declared war against Rosas in 1845 to support what was ultimately an unsuccessful rebellion in the Argentine province of Corrientes. Although Britain and France prevented him from moving against Paraguay, Rosas established a trade embargo on Paraguayan goods.

After Rosas fell in 1852, López signed a treaty with Buenos Aires that recognized Paraguay's independence, although the porteños never ratified it. In the same year, López signed treaties of friendship, commerce, and navigation with France and the United States. On 1 October 1853, the US warship  arrived on a visit in Asunción.

Nonetheless, growing tensions with several countries, including the United States, characterized the second half of López's rule. In 1858 the United States sent a flotilla to Paraguayan waters in a successful action to claim compensation for an American sailor who had been killed three years earlier when USS Water Witch had entered Paraguayan waters despite prohibition from Lopez.

López had recklessly dropped his policy of neutrality without determining where his allegiances lay. He allowed controversies and boundary disputes with Brazil and Argentina to smolder. The two regional giants had tolerated Paraguayan independence, partly because Paraguay served to check the expansionist tendencies of both opponents. Both were satisfied if the other could not dominate Paraguayan affairs. At the same time, a Paraguay that was antagonistic to both Brazil and Argentina would give these countries a reason for uniting.

Francisco Solano López, 1862–70

Born in 1827, Francisco Solano López became the second and final ruler of the López dynasty. After his father's death the Paraguayan Congress elected him President on 16 October 1862. Solano López consolidated his power after his father's death in 1862 by silencing several hundred critics and would-be reformers through imprisonment.

The government continued to exert control on all exports. The export of yerba mate and valuable wood products maintained the balance of trade between Paraguay and the outside world. The Paraguayan government was extremely protectionist, never accepted loans from abroad, and employed high tariffs against the importation of foreign products. This protectionism made the society self-sufficient. This also avoided the debt suffered by Argentina and Brazil.

Solano López had a pampered childhood; his father raised him to inherit his mantle and made him a brigadier general at the age of eighteen. His 1853 trip to Europe to buy arms was probably the most important experience of his life. In Paris, Solano López admired the trappings and pretensions of the French empire of Napoleon III. He fell in love with an Irish woman, Elisa Alicia Lynch, whom he made his lover. "La Lynch", as she became known in Paraguay, was a strong-willed, charming, witty, intelligent woman who became a person of enormous influence. Lynch's Parisian manners soon made her a trendsetter in the Paraguayan capital, and she made enemies as quickly as she made friends. Lynch bore Solano López five sons, although the two never married. She became the largest landowner in Paraguay after Solano López transferred most of Paraguay and portions of Brazil into her name during the war. She buried Solano López with her own hands after the last battle in 1870 and died penniless some years later in Europe.

Observers sharply disagreed about Solano López. George Thompson, an English engineer who worked for the younger López (he distinguished himself as a Paraguayan officer during the Paraguayan War, and later wrote a book about his experience), called him "a monster without parallel". Solano López's conduct laid him open to such charges. In the first place, Solano López's miscalculations and ambitions plunged Paraguay into a war with Argentina, Brazil, and Uruguay. The war resulted in the deaths of half of Paraguay's population and almost erased the country from the map. During the war, Solano López ordered the executions of his own brothers and had his mother and sisters tortured when he suspected them of opposing him. Thousands of others, including Paraguay's bravest soldiers and generals, also went to their deaths before firing squads or were hacked to pieces on Solano López's orders. Others saw Solano López as a paranoid megalomaniac, a man who wanted to be the "Napoleon of South America", willing to reduce his country to ruin and his countrymen to beggars in his vain quest for glory.

However, sympathetic Paraguayan nationalists and foreign revisionist historians have portrayed Solano López as a patriot who resisted to his last breath Argentine and Brazilian designs on Paraguay. They portrayed him as a tragic figure caught in a web of Argentine and Brazilian duplicity who mobilized the nation to repulse its enemies, holding them off heroically for five bloody, horror-filled years until Paraguay was finally overrun and prostrate. Since the 1930s, Paraguayans have regarded Solano López as the nation's foremost hero.

The Paraguayan War

Solano López accurately assessed the September 1864 Brazilian intervention in Uruguay as a threat not only to Uruguay but to Paraguay as well. He was also correct in his assumption that neither Brazil nor Argentina paid much attention to Paraguay's interests when formulating their policies. He was clear that preserving Uruguayan independence was crucial to Paraguay's future as a nation. Consistent with his plans to start a Paraguayan "third force" between Argentina and Brazil, Solano López committed the nation to Uruguay's aid.

In early 1864, López warned Brazil against intervening in Uruguay's internal conflict. Despite this, Brazil invaded Uruguay in October, 1864. On 12 November 1864, Lopez ordered the seizure of a Brazilian warship in Paraguayan territorial waters. López followed this with an invasion of the Mato Grosso province of Brazil, in March 1865, an action that proved to be one of Paraguay's few successes during the war.

When Argentina refused Solano López's request for permission for his army to cross Argentine territory to attack the Brazilian province of Río Grande do Sul, Solano López had himself declared a Marshal, and started a war against Argentina.

This invasion set the stage for the May 1865 signing by Argentina, Brazil, and Uruguay of the Treaty of the Triple Alliance. Under the treaty, these nations vowed to destroy Solano López's government.

Paraguay was not prepared for a big war. Its 30,000-man army was the most powerful in Latin America, but its strength was illusory because it lacked trained leadership, a reliable source of weapons and adequate reserves. Paraguay lacked the industrial base to replace weapons lost in battle, and the Argentine-Brazilian alliance prevented Solano López from receiving arms from abroad.

Paraguay's population was only about 450,000 in 1865, a figure lower than the number of people in the Brazilian National Guard, and completely dwarfed by the Allied population of 11 million. Even after conscripting every able-bodied male, including children as young as ten, and forcing women to perform all nonmilitary labor, Solano López still could not field an army as large as those of his enemies.

Apart from some Paraguayan victories on the northern front, the war was a disaster. The core units of the Paraguayan army reached Corrientes in April 1865. By July, more than half of Paraguay's 30,000-man invasion force had been killed or captured along with the army's best small arms and artillery. By 1867, Paraguay had lost 60,000 men to casualties, disease, or capture, and another 60,000 soldiers – slaves and children – were called to duty.

After October 1865 López changed his war plans from offensive to defensive. On 22 September 1866, at the Battle of Curupayty, Paraguayans inflicted a great defeat on the Allied army and until November 1867 there was a relative lull in the fighting.

In February 1868 two Brazilian warships sailed up the River Paraguay and caused a panic in Asunción. On 24 February they entered the port of Asunción, shelled the city and left, without attempting to capture it. During this time López was not in Asunción and perceived all the defensive actions that were taken by his government, including his vice-president and brothers, as a giant conspiracy against his rule. In his base at San Fernando, López organized a wave of torture and executions against the supposed conspirators. Many victims were lanced to death in order to save ammunition. The bodies were dumped in mass graves.

Solano López's hostility even extended to United States Ambassador to Paraguay Charles Ames Washburn. Only the timely arrival of the United States gunboat Wasp saved the diplomat from arrest. However, López had a good relationship with the new US ambassador General Martin T. McMahon.

By the end of 1868, the Paraguayan army had shrunk to a few thousand soldiers (many of them children and women) who exhibited suicidal bravery. Cavalry units operated on foot for lack of horses. Naval infantry battalions armed only with machetes attacked Brazilian ironclads. "Conquer or die" became the order of the day.

During December, the Allies continued to destroy the remaining resistance and on 1 January 1869, they entered Asunción. Solano López held out in the northern jungles for another fourteen months until he finally died in battle.

1870 marked the lowest point in Paraguayan history. Hundreds of thousands of Paraguayans had died. Destitute and practically destroyed, Paraguay had to endure a lengthy occupation by foreign troops and cede large patches of territory to Brazil and Argentina.

Under occupation, 1870–76

The allied occupation of Asunción in 1869 put the victors in direct control of Paraguayan affairs. While Bolivia and Argentina pressed their claims to the Gran Chaco, Argentina (with the Machaín-Irigoyen Treaty) and Brazil (with the Loizaga – Cotegipe Treaty) swallowed 154,000 square kilometers of Paraguayan territory.

Brazil had borne the brunt of the fighting, with perhaps 150,000 dead and 65,000 wounded. It had spent US$200 million, and its troops formed the largest army of occupation in the country; as a result Brazil temporarily overshadowed Argentina in control of the country. Sharp disagreements between the two powers prolonged the Allied occupation until 1876.

Ruined by war, pestilence, famine, and unpaid foreign indemnities, Paraguay was on the verge of disintegration in 1870. Its fertile soil and the country's overall backwardness helped it survive. Paraguay's mostly rural populace continued to subsist as it had done for centuries, eking out a meager existence under difficult conditions.

Ownership of the Paraguayan economy quickly passed to foreign speculators and adventurers who rushed to take advantage of the rampant chaos and corruption. The Paraguayan economy, which until then was mostly state owned, was dismantled and privatized, and became dominated by Argentinian and European companies.

During the Presidency of Juan Bautista Gill (1874–77), after the Machaín-Irigoyen Treaty was signed, the occupying Brazilian troops finally left the country in mid-summer of 1876.

Legionnaires

The post-war political vacuum was initially dominated by survivors of the anti-López Paraguayan Legion. This group of exiles, based in Buenos Aires, had regarded Solano López as a mad tyrant and fought on the Allied side during the war. This group set up a provisional government in 1869, mainly under Brazilian auspices, and signed the 1870 peace accords, which guaranteed Paraguay's independence and free river navigation. A new Constitution was also promulgated in the same year, but it proved ineffective because of the foreign origin of its liberal, democratic tenets.

The Legionnaires were refugees and exiles who dated from Francia's day. Their opposition to tyranny was sincere, and they gravitated toward democratic ideologies. Coming home to backward, poor, xenophobic Paraguay from cosmopolitan, prosperous Buenos Aires was a big shock for the Legionnaires. Believing that more freedom would cure Paraguay's ills, they abolished slavery and founded a constitutional government as soon as they came to power. They based the new government on the standard classical liberal prescriptions of free enterprise, free elections, and free trade.

The Legionnaires, however, had no more experience in the principles of republics than other Paraguayans. The 1870 constitution quickly became irrelevant. Politics degenerated into factionalism, and cronyism and intrigue prevailed. Presidents still acted like dictators, elections did not stay free, and the Legionnaires were out of power in less than a decade.

Free elections were a startling, and not altogether welcome, innovation for ordinary Paraguayans, who had always allied themselves with a patrón (benefactor) for security and protection. At the same time, Argentina and Brazil were not content to leave Paraguay with a truly free political system. Pro-Argentine militia chief Benigno Ferreira for a short time emerged as de facto dictator until his overthrow by Bernardino Caballero with Brazilian help in 1874. Ferreira later returned to lead the 1904 Liberal uprising, which ousted the Colorados. Ferreira then served as President between 1906 and 1908.

Provisional government, 1869–70

With Solano López on the run, the country lacked a government. Pedro II sent his Foreign minister José Paranhos to Asunción where he arrived on 20 February 1869, and began consultations with the local politicians. On 31 March a petition was signed by 335 leading citizens asking the Allies for a provisional government. This was followed by negotiations between the Allied countries who put aside some of more controversial points of the Treaty of the Triple Alliance and on 11 June an agreement was reached with Paraguayan opposition figures that a three-man provisional government would be established. On 22 July a National Assembly met in the National Theatre and elected a Junta Nacional of 21 men, which then selected a five-man committee to select three men for the provisional government. They selected Carlos Loizaga, Juan Francisco Decoud, and José Díaz de Bedoya. Decoud was unacceptable to Paranhos, who had him replaced with Cirilo Antonio Rivarola. The government was finally installed on 15 August, but was just a front for the continued Allied occupation.

The provisional government consisted of:
President of the Council, Colonel Carlos Loizaga.
Secretary of the Interior, Cirilo Antonio Rivarola.
Secretary of the Treasury, José Díaz de Bedoya.

After the death of López, the provisional government issued a proclamation on 6 March 1870, in which it promised to support political liberties, to protect commerce and to promote immigration, but the Provisional government did not last. In May 1870 José Díaz de Bedoya resigned and on 31 August 1870, Carlos Loizaga also resigned. The remaining member Antonio Rivarola was then relieved of his duties by the National Assembly which established a provisional Presidency to which Facundo Machaín was elected. He assumed the post on 31 August 1870, but was overthrown the next day in a coup which restored Rivarola to power.

Post-war political conflicts
The politics of the first post-war decade were heavily influenced by deeply personal conflicts between López loyalists and their more liberal opponents, but just as important was the backing of various politicians by Argentina and Brazil. In the end the Brazilian-supported politicians won, and established the rule of the Colorado party.

After Cirilo Antonio Rivarola resigned from the presidency in December 1871, Salvador Jovellanos came to power, backed by General Benigno Ferreira. Jovellanos was an accidental president, and after facing repeated revolts form López loyalists in 1873 and 1874, first Ferreira and then Jovellanos fled into exile. General Bernardino Caballero was the power behind the throne during terms of President Juan Bautista Gill, who was assassinated in 1877, and his political mentor, President Cándido Bareiro, who died from stroke in 1880. At this point Caballero assumed the presidency and laid the foundations of the two-party system, remaining one of the most influential politicians until the 1904 Liberal revolution.

Liberals versus Colorados

The era of party politics in Paraguay was free to begin in earnest. Nonetheless, the evacuation of foreign forces did not mean the end of foreign influence. Both Brazil and Argentina remained deeply involved in Paraguay as a result of their connections with Paraguay's rival political forces. The political rivalry between future Liberals and Colorados started already in 1869 before the war was over, when the terms Azules (Blues) and Colorados (Reds) first appeared.

Factions
The remaining López loyalists gathered around Cándido Bareiro who, on 31 March 1869, founded the Republican Union Club which in early 1870 became the Club del Pueblo and after 17 February 1878, Club Libertad and who published their newspaper La Voz del Pueblo. The Bareiro faction was also known as lopiztas because of their loyalty to the memory of President López and it was opposed to the Decoud faction who had established their rival Club del Pueblo (after 23 March 1870, the Gran Club del Pueblo).

On 26 June 1869, the Decoud faction established their Club del Pueblo, led by Facundo Machaín, and on 1 October 1869, they started publishing the newspaper La Regeneración. Their rivals, López loyalists, established Club Unión with Cayo Miltos as president. So the two currents that eventually led to the Liberal and Colorado Parties began.

In the decade following the war, the principal political conflicts within Paraguay reflected the Liberal-Colorado split, with Legionnaires battling Lopiztas (ex-followers of Solano López) for power, while Brazil and Argentina maneuvered in the background. The Legionnaires saw the Lopiztas as reactionaries. The Lopiztas accused the Legionnaires of being traitors and foreign puppets. Many people constantly changed political sides. Political and financial opportunism characterized this era, not ideological purity.

The Liberal and Colorado Parties were officially established in 1887. Both parties had former López supporters and Paraguayan Legion veterans in their ranks. Liberal party came to be divided among civicos (civics) and radicales (radicals) factions, while Colorados were split among caballeristas (supporters of president Bernardino Caballero) and egusquicistas (supporters of president Juan Bautista Egusquiza).

The National Republican Association-Colorado Party (Asociación Nacional Republicana-Partido Colorado) dominated Paraguayan political life from the mid-1880s until Liberals overthrew it in 1904. The following ascent of Liberal Party marked the decline of Brazilian influence, which had supported the Colorados as the principal political force in Paraguay, and the rise of Argentine influence.

The first Colorado era

Cándido Bareiro, López's former commercial agent in Europe, returned to Paraguay in 1869 and around him grew a group of López loyalists, including Bernardino Caballero and Patricio Escobar but also López opponents, including Juan Bautista Gill, who eventually was elected to the presidency. After President Juan Bautista Gill was assassinated in 1877, Caballero used his power as army commander to guarantee Bareiro's election as president in 1878. When Bareiro died from a stroke in 1880, Caballero seized power in a bloodless coup and dominated Paraguayan politics for most of the next two decades, either as President or through his power in the army. His accession to power is notable because he brought political stability, founded the Colorado Party in 1887 to regulate the choice of Presidents and the distribution of spoils, and began a process of economic reconstruction.

In 1878, the international commission led by US President Rutherford B. Hayes awarded Paraguay the disputed Chaco area between the Río Verde and Río Pilcomayo. In his honor the Presidente Hayes Department was created.

Governments led by two former López-era officers Bernardino Caballero (1880–86) and Patricio Escobar (1886–90) started a more earnest national reconstruction. A general political amnesty was proclaimed and opposition allowed in Parliament. National University was founded in 1889. A census in 1886–87 showed a population of 329,645. To improve this, foreign immigration was encouraged.

Despite their professed admiration for Francia, the Colorados dismantled Francia's unique system of state socialism. Desperate for cash because of heavy debts incurred in London in the early postwar period, the Colorados lacked a source of funds except through the sale of the state's vast holdings, which comprised more than 95% of Paraguay's total land. Caballero's government sold much of this land to foreigners in huge lots. While Colorado politicians raked in the profits and themselves became large landowners, peasant squatters who had farmed the land for generations were forced to vacate and, in many cases, to emigrate. By 1900, seventy-nine people owned half of the country's land.

Although the Liberals had advocated the same land-sale policy, the unpopularity of the sales and evidence of pervasive government corruption produced a tremendous outcry from the opposition. Liberals became bitter foes of selling land, especially after the 1887 elections, which were marked by State-sponsored violence against the opposition. Ex-Legionnaires, idealistic reformers, and former Lopiztas joined in July 1887, shortly after these elections, to form the Centro Democrático (Democratic Center), a precursor of the Liberal party, demanding free elections, an end to land sales, civilian control over the military, and clean government. Caballero responded, along with his principal adviser, José Segundo Decoud, and Escobar, by forming the Colorado Party one month later, thus formalizing the two party system. Both parties had internal divisions and very little ideology separated them, allowing Colorado and Liberal members to change sides whenever it proved advantageous. While the Colorados reinforced their monopoly on power and spoils, Liberals called for reform.

Frustration provoked an aborted Liberal revolt in 1891 that produced changes in 1894, when war minister General Juan Bautista Egusquiza overthrew Caballero's chosen President, Juan Gualberto González. Egusquiza startled Colorado stalwarts by sharing power with the Liberals, a move that split both parties. Ex-Legionnaire Ferreira along with the cívico (civic) wing of the Liberals joined the government of Egusquiza, who left office in 1898 to allow a civilian, Emilio Aceval, to become President. Liberal radicales (radicals) who opposed compromising with their Colorado enemies boycotted the new arrangement. Caballero, also boycotting the alliance, plotted to overthrow civilian rule and succeeded when Colonel Juan Antonio Escurra seized power in 1902. This victory was Caballero's last, however. In 1904 the old nemesis of Caballero, General Benigno Ferreira, with the support of cívicos, radicales, and egusquistas, invaded from Argentina. After four months of fighting, Escurra signed the Pact of Pilcomayo aboard an Argentine gunboat on 12 December 1904, and handed power to the Liberals.

Liberal era, 1904–36

The Liberal Revolution of August 1904 began as a popular movement, but Liberal rule quickly degenerated into factional feuding, military coups, and civil wars. Political instability was extreme in the Liberal era, which saw twenty-one governments in thirty-six years. During the period 1904 to 1922, Paraguay had fifteen presidents.

Revolution of 1904
The 1904 Revolution was organized in Buenos Aires by Paraguayan exiles led by Manuel J. Duarte who was serving in the Argentine navy. Rebels used Paraguayan merchant ship Sajonia, whose captain was a Liberal supporter. On 4 August 1904 rebels took control of the ship in the port of Buenos Aires. The ship later was boarded by Liberal soldiers who brought thousands of rifles, machine guns and small artillery guns on board.

After learning about this ship, President Juan Antonio Escurra declared a state of siege on 8 August. The Paraguayan army at that time had some 1500 and no real navy, so another merchant ship, Villa Rica, was used for military purposes and sent towards Sajonia. Both ships met on 11 August near town of Pilar and very quickly Villa Rica was sunk, killing 28 government sailors. Rebels then left the ship and for the next five months continued a war with the government. The fighting ended on 12 December 1904, when in a deal negotiated by Brazilian diplomat Brasílio Itiberê da Cunha, the Pilcomayo Pact, Escurra resigned and a temporary President, Juan Bautista Gaona, from the Liberal party was sworn in on 19 December 1904. On 25 November 1906, the old Liberal hero, General Benigno Ferreira, was elected to the presidency.

By 1908, the Liberal radicales had overthrown General Ferreira and the cívicos. The Liberals had disbanded Caballero's army when they came to power and organized a completely new one. Nevertheless, by 1910 army commander Colonel Albino Jara felt strong enough to stage a coup against President Manuel Gondra. Jara's coup backfired as it touched off an anarchic two-year period in which every major political group seized power at least once and led to the Civil War of 1912. The radicales again invaded from Argentina, and when the charismatic Eduardo Schaerer became president, Gondra returned as Minister of War to reorganize the army once more. Schaerer became the first president since Egusquiza to finish his four-year term.

The new political calm was shattered, however, when the radicales split into Schaerer and Gondra factions. Gondra won the Presidential election in 1920, but the schaereristas undermined his power and forced him to resign. A full-scale Paraguayan Civil War of 1922–23 between the factions broke out in May 1922 and lasted fourteen months. The gondristas beat the schaereristas decisively and held on to power until 1936.

Laissez-faire Liberal policies had permitted a handful of hacendados to exercise almost feudal control over the countryside, while peasants had no land and foreign interests manipulated Paraguay's economic fortunes. The Liberals, like the Colorados, were a deeply factionalized political oligarchy. Social conditions – always marginal in Paraguay – deteriorated during the Great Depression of the 1930s. The country clearly needed reforms in working conditions, public services, and education.

The Chaco War

Paraguay's dispute with Bolivia over the Chaco, a struggle that had been brewing for decades, finally derailed the Liberals. Wars and poor diplomacy had prevented the settling of boundaries between the two countries during the century following independence. Although Paraguay had held the Chaco for as long as anyone could remember, the country did little to develop the area. Aside from scattered Mennonite colonies and nomadic Indian tribes, few people lived there. Bolivia's claim to the Chaco became more urgent after it lost its sea coast (the Atacama region) to Chile during the 1879–84 War of the Pacific. Left without any outlet to the sea, Bolivia wanted to absorb the Chaco and expand its territory up to the Paraguay river in order to gain a river port. In addition, the Chaco's economic potential intrigued the Bolivians. Oil had been discovered there by Standard Oil in the 1920s, and people wondered whether an immense pool of oil was lying beneath the entire area.

The Chaco issue
While Paraguayans were busy fighting among themselves during the 1920s, Bolivians established a series of forts in the Paraguayan Chaco. In addition, they bought armaments from Germany and hired German military officers to train and lead their forces. Frustration in Paraguay with Liberal inaction boiled over in 1928 when the Bolivian army established a fort on the Paraguay river called Fortín Vanguardia. In December of that year, Paraguayan major (later colonel) Rafael Franco took matters into his own hands, led a surprise attack on the fort, and succeeded in destroying it. The routed Bolivians responded quickly by seizing two Paraguayan forts. Both sides mobilized but the Liberal government felt unprepared for war so it agreed to the humiliating condition of rebuilding Fortín Vanguardia for the Bolivians. The Liberal government also provoked criticism when it forced Franco, by then a national hero, to retire from the army.

As diplomats from Argentina, the United States, and the League of Nations conducted fruitless "reconciliation" talks, Colonel José Félix Estigarribia, Paraguay's deputy army commander, ordered his troops into action against Bolivian positions early in 1931. Meanwhile, nationalist agitation led by the National Independent League (Liga Nacional Independiente) increased. Formed in 1928 by a group of intellectuals, the League sought a new era in national life that would witness a great political and social rebirth. Its adherents advocated a "new democracy" that, they hoped, would sweep the country free of petty partisan interests and foreign encroachments. An amalgam of diverse ideologies and interests, the League reflected a genuine popular wish for social change. When government troops fired on a mob of League students demonstrating in front of the Government Palace in October 1931, the Liberal administration of President José Guggiari lost what little legitimacy it retained. The students and soldiers of the rising "New Paraguay" movement (which wanted to sweep away corrupt party politics and introduce nationalist and socialist reforms) would thereafter always see the Liberals as morally bankrupt.

The war and Liberal downfall

When war finally broke out officially in July 1932, the Bolivians were confident of a rapid victory. Their country was richer and more populous than Paraguay, and their armed forces were larger, had a superior officer corps, and were well-trained and well-equipped. These advantages quickly proved irrelevant in the face of the Paraguayans' zeal to defend their homeland. The highly motivated Paraguayans knew the geography of the Chaco better than the Bolivians and easily infiltrated Bolivian lines, surrounded outposts, and captured supplies. In contrast, Indians from the Bolivian high plateau area, known as the Altiplano, were forced into the Bolivian army, had no real interest in the war, and failed to adapt to the hot Chaco climate. In addition, long supply lines, poor roads, and weak logistics hindered the Bolivian campaign. The Paraguayans proved more united than the Bolivians, at least initially, as President Eusebio Ayala and Colonel (later Marshal) Estigarribia worked well together.

After the December 1933 Paraguayan victory at Campo Via, Bolivia seemed on the verge of surrender. At that moment, however, President Ayala agreed to a truce. His decision was greeted with derision in Asunción. Instead of ending the war with a swift victory that might have boosted their political prospects, the Liberals signed a truce that seemed to allow the Bolivians to regroup. The war continued until July 1935. Although the Liberals had successfully led Paraguay's occupation of nearly all the disputed territory and had won the war when the last truce went into effect, they were finished politically.

In many ways, the Chaco War acted as a catalyst to unite the political opposition with workers and peasants, who furnished the raw materials for a social revolution. After the 1935 truce, thousands of soldiers were sent home, leaving the regular army to patrol the front lines. The soldiers who had shared the dangers and trials of the battlefield deeply resented the ineptitude and incompetence they believed the Liberals had shown in failing to prepare the country for war. These soldiers had witnessed the miserable state of the Paraguayan army and were forced in many cases to face the enemy armed only with machetes. After what they had been through, partisan political differences seemed irrelevant. The government offended the army rank-and-file by refusing to fund pensions for disabled war veterans in 1936 while awarding 1,500 gold pesos a year to Estigarribia. Colonel Franco, back on active duty since 1932, became the focus of the nationalist rebels inside and outside the army. The final spark to rebellion came when Franco was exiled for criticizing Ayala. On 17 February 1936, units of the army descended on the Presidential Palace and forced Ayala to resign, ending thirty-two years of Liberal rule.

Military dictatorships

The February Revolution

The revolution of February 1936 overthrew Liberal Party politicians who had won the war. The soldiers, veterans, students, and others who revolted actually felt that victory had come despite the Liberal government. Promising a national and social revolution, they occupied Asunción and brought Colonel Rafael Franco to power.

During its 18 months of existence, the Franco government showed that it was serious about social justice by expropriating more than 200,000 hectares of land and distributing it to 10,000 peasant families. In addition, the new government guaranteed workers the right to strike and established an eight-hour work day.

Perhaps the government's most lasting contribution affected national consciousness. In a gesture calculated to rewrite history and erase seven decades of national shame, Franco declared Francisco Solano López a national hero "sin ejemplar" (without precedent) because he had stood up to foreign threats, and sent a team to Cerro Corá to find his unmarked grave. His remains, along with those of his father, were buried in the National Pantheon of the Heroes. A monument to him was erected on Asunción's highest hill.

Despite the popular enthusiasm that greeted the February Revolution, Franco's government lacked a clear program. In a sign of the times, Franco practiced his Mussolini-style spellbinding oratory from a balcony. But when he published his distinctly fascist-sounding Decree Law No. 152 promising a "totalitarian transformation" similar to those in Europe, protests erupted. The youthful, idealistic elements that had come together to produce the Febrerista movement were actually a hodgepodge of conflicting political tendencies and social opposites, and Franco was soon in deep political trouble. Franco's cabinet reflected almost every conceivable shade of dissident political opinion, and included socialists, fascist sympathizers, nationalists, Colorados, and Liberal cívicos.

A new party of regime supporters, the Revolutionary National Union (Unión Nacional Revolucionaria), was founded in November 1936. Although the new party called for representative democracy, rights for peasants and workers, and socialization of key industries, it failed to broaden Franco's political base. In the end, Franco lost his popular support because he failed to keep his promises to the poor. He dared not expropriate the properties of foreign landowners, who were mostly Argentines. In addition, the Liberals, who still had influential support in the army, agitated constantly for Franco's overthrow. When Franco ordered Paraguayan troops to abandon the advanced positions in the Chaco that they had held since the 1935 truce, the army revolted in August 1937 and returned the Liberals to power.

The army, however, did not hold a unified opinion about the Febreristas. Several attempted coups served to remind President Félix Paiva (the former dean of law at the National University) that although the February Revolution was out of power, it was far from dead. People who suspected that the Liberals had learned nothing from their term out of office soon had proof: a peace treaty signed with Bolivia on 21 July 1938, fixed the final boundaries behind the Paraguayan battle lines.

Estigarribia

In 1939 the Liberal politicians, recognizing that they had to choose someone with national stature and popularity to be President if they wanted to keep power, picked General José Félix Estigarribia as their candidate on 19 March 1939. This hero of the Chaco War was serving as a special envoy to the United States, and on 13 June Estigarribia and US Secretary of State Cordell Hull signed the Export-Import Bank loan of US$3.5 million. This greatly increased US influence in the country where Nazi sympathies were common. On 15 August 1939, he assumed the presidency and quickly realized that he would have to continue many of the ideas of the February Revolution to avoid political anarchy. He began a program of land reform that promised a small plot of land to every Paraguayan family. He reopened the University, implemented monetary and municipal reforms, balanced the budget, financed the public debt, increased the capital of the Central Bank of Paraguay, and drew up plans to build highways and public works with the loan from the United States.

Estigarribia faced sharp criticism from the conservative Catholic intellectuals and their newspaper El Tiempo as well as leftist febrerista student activists in the university. After anti-government demonstrations broke out in Asunción, the army suppressed them and arrested Catholic and febrerista leaders. This led to a withdrawal of Colorado support for Estigarribia, and an attempted coup on 14 February 1940 broke out in Campo Grande military base.

On the same day Estigarribia proposed to establish a temporary dictatorship. This proposal split the Liberal party leadership, many of whom supported this idea, and on 18 February 1940 he established a temporary dictatorship, dismissing the 1870 Constitution and promising a new Constitution.

On 10 July the project of the new Constitution was published and on 4 August 1940, approved in the referendum. The new Constitution was based on the 1937 authoritarian Constitution of Brazil's Estado Novo and established a corporativist state. The Constitution of 1940 promised a "strong, but not despotic" President and a new state empowered to deal directly with social and economic problems. But by greatly expanding the power of the executive branch it served to legitimize open dictatorship. It greatly increased the powers of the Presidency, eliminated the vice-presidency, created a unicameral parliament, and increased the state's power over individual and property rights. It also gave  the military the duty to protect the Constitution, thus giving it a role in politics.

Morínigo, 1940–48

The era of the New Liberals, as Estigarribia's supporters were called, came to a sudden end on 7 September 1940, when the President and his wife died in an airplane crash. Hoping to maintain their control over government through a more submissive military man, the Old Liberal ministers and army leadership decided on the War Minister Higinio Moríñigo as the temporary President until new elections could be held in two months.

The apparently genial Moríñigo quickly proved himself a shrewd politician with a mind of his own, and Liberal ministers resigned on 30 September, when they realized that they could not impose their will on him. Having inherited Estigarribia's near-dictatorial powers provided by the new 1940 Constitution, Moríñigo quickly banned febreristas and Liberals and clamped down drastically on free speech and individual liberties.

A non-party dictator without a large body of supporters, Morínigo survived politically – despite many plots against him – because of his astute handling of an influential group of young military officers who held key positions of power.

The Allied victory in World War II pressured Moríñigo to liberalize his regime in 1946. Paraguay experienced a brief period of openness as he relaxed restrictions on free speech, allowed political exiles to return, and formed a coalition government with Liberals and febreristas. Moríñigo's intentions about stepping down were unclear, however, and he maintained a de facto alliance with Colorado Party hardliners and their right-wing Guión Rojo (Red Banner) paramilitary group led by Juan Natalico Gonzalez, which antagonized and terrorized the opposition. The result was a failed coup d'état in December 1946 and full-scale civil war erupted in March 1947. Led by the exiled dictator Rafael Franco, the revolutionaries were an unlikely coalition of febreristas, Liberals and Communists, united only in their desire to overthrow Moríñigo.

The Colorados helped Moríñigo crush the insurgency, but the man who saved Moríñigo's government during crucial battles was the commander of the General Brúgez Artillery Regiment, Lieutenant Colonel Alfredo Stroessner. When a revolt at the Asunción Navy Yard put a strategic working-class neighborhood in rebel hands, Stroessner's regiment quickly reduced this area to rubble. When rebel gunboats threatened to dash upriver from Argentina to bombard the capital into submission, Stroessner's forces battled furiously and destroyed them.

By the end of the rebellion in August 1948 the Colorado Party, which had been out of power since 1904, had almost total control in Paraguay. The fighting had simplified politics by eliminating all other parties and by reducing the size of the army. As 90% of the officer corps had joined the rebels, fewer individuals were now in a position to compete for power.

However, the Colorados were split into rival factions. The hardline guionistas, headed by the fiery left-leaning nationalist writer and publisher Juan Natalicio González, opposed democratic practices. The moderate democráticos, led by Federico Chávez, favored free elections and a power-sharing arrangement with the other parties.

With Moríñigo's backing, González used his Guión Rojo paramilitary to intimidate democráticos and gain his party's presidential nomination. He ran unopposed in the long-promised 1948 elections. Suspecting that Moríñigo would not relinquish power to González, a group of Colorado military officers, including Stroessner, removed Moríñigo from office on 3 June 1948. After a short Presidency, González joined Moríñigo in exile and Chavez assumed Presidency on 10 September 1949.

Moríñigo had maintained order by severely restricting individual liberties, but as a result, he created a political vacuum. When he tried to fill it with the Colorado Party, he split the party in two, and neither faction could establish itself in power without help from the military. The creation of one-party rule and order at the expense of political liberty and acceptance of the army's role as the final political arbiter created conditions for the emergence of Stroessner's regime.

Political consequences
Within a couple of decades, Paraguayan politics had come to a full-circle. The Chaco War had sparked the February Revolution, which signaled the end of Liberal rule and ushered in a revived Paraguayan nationalism that revered the dictatorial past of the López era. The result was the Constitution of 1940, which returned near-dictatorial powers to the Presidency, that the Liberals had stripped away. When a brief flirtation with multi-party democracy led to the Civil war, the Colorado Party, loyal to the memory of López, was once again running Paraguay. Meanwhile, the influence of the armed forces in the domestic politics had increased dramatically as no Paraguayan government since the Chaco War held the power without its consent.

Stroessner dictatorship, 1954–89

As one of the few officers who had remained loyal to Moríñigo, Stroessner became a formidable player once he entered the higher echelons of the armed forces. On 4 May 1954, Alfredo Stroessner enacted a coup d'état against then-President Federico Chávez. Fierce resistance by police left almost fifty dead.

Brazil's financing of the US$19 billion Itaipú Dam on the Paraná River between Paraguay and Brazil had far-reaching consequences for Paraguay; it had no means of contributing financially to the construction, but its cooperation, including controversial concessions regarding ownership of the construction site and the rates for which Paraguay agreed to sell its share of the electricity, was essential. Itaipú gave Paraguay's economy a new source of wealth. The construction produced a tremendous economic boom, as thousands of Paraguayans who had never before held a regular job went to work on the enormous dam. From 1973 (when construction began) until 1982 (when it ended), gross domestic product grew more than 8% annually, double the rate for the previous decade and higher than growth rates in most other Latin American countries. Foreign exchange earnings from electricity sales to Brazil soared, and the newly employed Paraguayan workforce stimulated domestic demand, bringing about a rapid expansion in the agricultural sector.

Beyond the financial support he received from the United States – which supported his anti-communist struggle –, Stroessner's dictatorship was characterized by corruption and the distribution of favors among what was known as "the trilogy": the government, the Colorado Party and the armed forces. Smuggling – geographically favoured by Paraguay's location between Brazil, Argentina and Bolivia – became one of the main sources of income, from alcohol and drugs to cars and exotic animals. Some estimate that the volume of smuggling was three times the official export figure, and Stroessner used some of that money, as well as slices of major infrastructure works and the delivery of land, to buy the loyalty of his officers, many of whom amassed huge fortunes and large estates.

The concentration of wealth and land in the hands of a few made Paraguay the most unequal country on the planet. Humanitarian organizations such as Oxfam and Amnesty International have denounced that it continues to have one of the highest rates of land concentration in Latin America. According to Oxfam, 1.6% of the population owns 80% of the land. And, according to Oxfam, stronism is directly responsible: between 1954 and 1989 some 8 million hectares were distributed irregularly among friends of power, he says. That's a third of arable land.

On 3 February 1989, Stroessner was overthrown in a counter-coup headed by his close associate General Andrés Rodríguez. He went into exile in Brazil, where he died in 2006. At the time of his death, Stroessner was the defendant in several human rights cases in Paraguay. President Rodríguez instituted political, legal, and economic reforms and initiated a rapprochement with the international community. In the municipal elections of 1991, opposition candidates won several major urban centers, including Asunción.

Modern Paraguay
The June 1992 constitution established a democratic system of government and dramatically improved protection of fundamental rights. In May 1993, Colorado Party candidate Juan Carlos Wasmosy was elected as Paraguay's first civilian president in almost 40 years in what international observers deemed fair and free elections. The newly elected majority-opposition Congress quickly demonstrated its independence from the executive by rescinding legislation passed by the previous Colorado-dominated Congress. With support from the United States, the Organization of American States, and other countries in the region, the Paraguayan people rejected an April 1996 attempt by then Army Chief General Lino Oviedo to oust President Wasmosy, taking an important step to strengthen the Paraguayan Republic.

Oviedo became the Colorado candidate for president in the 1998 election, but when the Supreme Court of Paraguay upheld in April his conviction on charges related to the 1996 coup attempt, he was not allowed to run and remained in confinement. His former running mate, Raúl Cubas, became the Colorado Party's candidate and was elected in May in elections deemed by international observers to be free and fair. One of Cubas' first acts after taking office in August was to commute Oviedo's sentence and release him from confinement. In December 1998, Paraguay's Supreme Court declared these actions unconstitutional. After delaying for two months, Cubas openly defied the Supreme Court in February 1999, refusing to return Oviedo to jail. In this tense atmosphere, the murder of Vice President and long-time Oviedo rival Luis María Argaña on 23 March 1999, led the Chamber of Deputies to impeach Cubas the next day. The 26 March murder of eight student anti-government demonstrators, widely believed to have been carried out by Oviedo supporters, made it clear that the Senate would vote to remove Cubas on 29 March, and Cubas resigned on 28 March. Despite fears that the military would not allow the change of government, Senate President Luis González Macchi, a Cubas opponent, was sworn in as president that day. Cubas left for Brazil the next day and has since received asylum. Oviedo fled the same day, first to Argentina, then to Brazil. In December 2001, Brazil rejected Paraguay's petition to extradite Oviedo to stand trial for the March 1999 assassination and "Marzo Paraguayo" incident.

González Macchi offered cabinet positions in his government to senior representatives of all three political parties in an attempt to create a coalition government. While the Liberal Party pulled out of the government in February 2000, the Gonzalez Macchi government has achieved a consensus among the parties on many controversial issues, including economic reform. Liberal Julio César Franco won the August 2000 election to fill the vacant vice presidential position. In August 2001, the lower house of Congress considered but did not pass a motion to impeach González Macchi for alleged corruption and inefficient governance. In 2003, Nicanor Duarte was elected and sworn in as president.

On 1 August 2004 a supermarket in Asunción burned down, killing nearly 400 people and injuring hundreds more.

On 1 July 2005, the United States reportedly deployed troops and aircraft to the large military airfield of Mariscal Estigarribia as part of a bid to extend control of strategic interests in the Latin American sphere, particularly in Bolivia. A military training agreement with Asunción, giving immunity to US soldiers, caused some concern after media reports initially reported that a base housing 20,000 US soldiers was being built at Mariscal Estigarribia within 200 km of Argentina and Bolivia, and 300 km of Brazil, near an airport which could receive large planes (B-52, C-130 Hercules, etc.) which the Paraguayan Air Force does not have. At present, no more than 400 U.S. troops are expected.

The governments of Paraguay and the United States subsequently declared that the use of an airport (Dr Luís María Argaña International) was a point of transfer for few soldiers in Paraguay at the same time. According to the Clarín Argentinian newspaper, the US military base is strategic because of its location near the Triple Frontera between Paraguay, Brazil, and Argentina; its proximity towards the Guarani aquifer; and, finally, its closeness toward Bolivia (less than 200 km) at the same "moment that Washington's magnifying glass goes on the Altiplano and points toward Venezuelan Hugo Chávez as the instigator of the instability in the region" (El Clarín), making a clear reference to the Bolivian Gas War.

For the 2008 general elections, the Colorado Party was once again a favorite. However, this time the candidate was not an internal opponent to the President and self-proclaimed reformer, as in the two previous elections, but Minister of Education Blanca Ovelar, the first woman to appear as a candidate for a major party in Paraguayan history. After sixty years of one-party rule by the Colorados, the voters this time chose a non-politician, former Roman Catholic bishop Fernando Lugo, a long time follower of the controversial Liberation Theology but backed by the center-right Liberal Party, the Colorados' traditional opponents.

Outgoing President Nicanor Duarte reflected on the defeat and hailed the moment as the first time in the history of his nation that a government handed power to opposition forces in an orderly and peaceful fashion. Lugo was sworn in on 15 August 2008 and impeached in 2012.

In 2013 Horacio Cartes was elected president. Cartes wanted to amend the constitution to allow for presidential re-elections, but widespread protests prevented him from materializing his goal (see:2017 Paraguayan crisis).
In August 2018, Mario Abdo Benítez sworn in as his successor after winning  2018 presidential election. Both President Mario Abdo Benitez and his predecessor Horacio Cortes represented conservative and right-wing Colorado Party.

See also
History of the Americas
History of Latin America
History of South America
List of presidents of Paraguay
Politics of Paraguay
Spanish colonization of the Americas

References

Notes

Works cited
 Hanratty, Dannin M. & Sandra W. Meditz. Paraguay: a country study. Library of Congress Federal Research Division (December 1988).

Further reading